Eucalyptus tetraptera, commonly known as square-fruited mallee or four-winged mallee, is a mallee that is endemic to the south coast of Western Australia. It has smooth bark, thick lance-shaped to oblong adult leaves, single flower buds arranged in leaf axils, red to pink flowers and square, prominently winged fruit.

Description
It usually has a single low branching trunk with smooth, grey or whitish-grey bark. Flowering occurs from late winter to mid summer and the flowers are red to pink.

Taxonomy and namingEucalyptus tetraptera was first formally described by the Russian botanist Nikolai Turczaninow in 1849 in the journal, Bulletin de la Société Impériale des Naturalistes de Moscou from specimens collected in 1848 by James Drummond. The specific epithet (tetraptera) is from ancient Greek words meaning "four" and "winged" referring to the fruit of this species.

Distribution and habitat
The distribution of the square-fruited mallee is limited to coastal sandplains where it is also found among granite outcrops of southern Western Australia, north from the Stirling Ranges and south to around Albany east to Israelite Bay in the Great Southern and Goldfields-Esperance regions where it grows in white or grey sandy soils in heath.

Conservation status
This eucalypt is classified as "not threatened" by the Western Australian Government Department of Parks and Wildlife.

UsesE. tetraptera'' is one of the most bizarre of the eucalypts with its spectacular, large, red buds and fruit. A popular ornamental,
it grows well in full sun in semi-arid climates but is slower growing in cooler climates. It is smog and frost resistant and can be kept in containers. As the plant becomes straggly with age it can be cut back to ground level to rejuvenate. The plant is commercially available as seedlings or as seeds. As for most Eucalypts, the seeds will germinate readily.

See also
List of Eucalyptus species

References

tetraptera
Myrtales of Australia
Eucalypts of Western Australia
Mallees (habit)
Plants described in 1849
Taxa named by Nikolai Turczaninow